The University of Connecticut (UConn) Neag School of Education offers undergraduate and graduate degrees in education, sport management, and leadership across four campuses, with the main campus located in Storrs, Connecticut. The Storrs location is home to the Neag Center for Gifted Education and Talent Development, and additional locations are in Hartford, Waterbury, and Groton. It is ranked number 16 among public graduate schools of education in the nation. The schools' research and teaching programs have been funded by a wide number of institutions, such as the National Science Foundation and the Department of Education.

History
The Neag School of Education was founded in 1940 when the Connecticut Agricultural College became the University of Connecticut. It is based in the Charles B. Gentry Building, which as built in 1960 in honor of the former director of the Division of Teacher Training and University President.

In 1958, the School of Education established the first high school in the town of Mansfield, E. O. Smith High School, as a laboratory school for teacher training and education research. The high school, which lies adjacent to campus, was operated by the University of Connecticut until 1987, when it became the regional public high school. E.O. Smith has maintained an Agricultural Science education program since its time as a part of UConn, and junior and senior high school students may take classes for credit on UConn's campus.

In 1999, the School of Education was renamed after Ray Neag, a businessman and graduate of UConn. Neag was co-Vice Chairman of Arrow International, Inc., a leading manufacturer of medical devices. The donation of $21 million is the largest gift given to an education school in the nation. In 2000, the building underwent major reconstruction, and a 20,000-square-foot wing was added to the west side of the building.

The former deans of the School of Education are:
 1919–1921	Theodore Eaton
 1921–1940	Charles B. Gentry
 1940–1948	P. Roy Brammell
 1948–1949	William Gruhn (acting)
 1949–1960	P. Roy Brammell
 1960–1961	C.A. Weber (acting)
 1961–1964	F. Robert Paulsen
 1964–1965	Glenn C. Atkyns (acting)
 1965–1972	William H. Roe
 1972–1975	Harry J. Hartley
 1975–1987	Mark R. Shibles
 1987–1988	David N. Camaione (acting)
 1988–1996	Charles W. Case
 1996–1997	Judith A. Meagher (acting)
 1997–2009	Richard L. Schwab
 2009–2014	Thomas C. DeFranco
 2014–2016	Richard L. Schwab
 2016–2021	Gladis Kersaint
 2021-present	Jason Irizarry

Academics

Academic Areas
The Neag School of Education is home to three departments (Department of Curriculum & Instruction, Department of Educational Leadership, Department of Educational Psychology) and one center (Teacher Education)

Department of Curriculum and Instruction
The Department of Curriculum and Instruction offers Bachelor's, Master's, and Doctorate programs in curriculum and instruction for both pre-service and in-service educators. The program does not offer a teacher credential, which is only offered through the Teacher Certification Program for College Graduates (TCPCG) program (see Teacher Education). The undergraduate programs allow students to gain core competencies in teaching at all levels of education. The graduate programs allow for more specialized knowledge in a content area (math, science, or social studies) to prepare for additional certification later on. Doctoral programs allow students to pursue positions as professors or researchers in wide array of settings. The two main research units are the New Literacies Research Lab, which is recognized as the world's premier labor for reading comprehension and learning skills required for emerging information and communication technologies, and the Reading/Language Arts Center, which facilitates the improvement of literacy instruction. One particular focus of the program is strengthening Connecticut's investments in K-12 science programs and other STEM fields.

Department of Educational Leadership
The Department of Educational Leadership connects theory, practice, and policy in a variety of academic programs, including educational leadership, education policy, executive leadership, and more. The program is also home to the university's Sport Management program, offering undergraduate, master's, and doctoral degrees.

Department of Educational Psychology

Teacher Education
The Teacher Education center offers two programs. First, the Teacher Certification Program for College Graduates (TCPCG) is an 11-month, full-time, accelerated program that allows students to earn a Connecticut Teacher Certification and an MA in Curriculum and Instruction or MA in Educational Psychology. Students are required to complete coursework in addition to passing all relevant PRAXIS II examinations, as required by the state. Most recently, the program expanded to offer a track in Mandarin Chinese, in addition to its programs in French, Spanish, German, Italian, and Latin.

Second, the Integrated Bachelor’s/Master’s (IB/M) Program in Teacher Education is a five-year, advanced program for undergraduates. Graduates of the program receive a Bachelor of Science in Education, a Master of Arts in Curriculum, and a Master of Arts in Educational Psychology (Special Education). The accelerated track of the program allows for students to gain exposure to a number of areas within five years. The IB/M program began in 1987 from conversations between the Holmes Group, John Goodlad, and the National Network for Educational Renewal. The IB/M program offers courses of study in the following areas: Elementary Education (Grades 1–6), Secondary Education (Grades 7–12), Comprehensive Special Education (K–12), and Music Education (PK–12). The program is built upon 6 key tenets which emphasize the common core of pedagogical knowledge required for all education majors, as well as clinical experience in a variety of environments. In the first two years of the program, students complete a well-rounded liberal arts coursework. In the Junior Year (known as the Common Core), students begin to take courses designed to help them learn about students as learners. In the senior year of the program, students gain more specific pedagogical knowledge. And, in the master's year, students gain clinic experience through an internship. In 2007, 90.7% of the IB/M program was female.

Accreditation & Rankings
The Neag School of Education is accredited by the National Council for Accreditation of Teacher Education (NCATE). The accreditation covers teacher-preparation programs and advanced-education-preparation programs at the University of Connecticut and its regional campuses.

In five specialty programs (Special Education, Educational Administration, Educational Psychology, Elementary Education, and Secondary Education), the Neag School of Education is recognized as in the top 25 in the nation.

Considered a Public Ivy, the main campus of the University of Connecticut is located in Storrs and is considered one of the leading research universities in the United States.

The school aims to be diverse with the following demographics in the 2018–2019 academic year: White (64%), Unknown (9.5%), Hispanic/Latinx (8.5%), Black/African American (8%), Asian (6.5%), Two or more races (3.1%), American Indian/Alaska Native (0.3%), and Native Hawaiian/Other Pacific Islander (0.1%).

Research Centers
The Neag School of Education promotes interdisciplinary research and education. It works with five main research centers at the University of Connecticut: Research Centers Center for Behavioral Education and Research (CBER), Center for Education Policy Analysis (CEPA), Center on Postsecondary Education and Disability (CPED), Reading and Language Arts Center, and the Renzulli Center for Creativity, Gifted Education, and Talent Development. It is also affiliated with the National Center for Research on Gifted Education (NCGRE), which is funded by the Department of Education.

See also
 University of Connecticut School of Business
 University of Connecticut School of Dental Medicine
 University of Connecticut School of Engineering
 University of Connecticut School of Law
 University of Connecticut School of Medicine

References

Education in Hartford, Connecticut
University of Connecticut
Schools of education in Connecticut
1940 establishments in Connecticut
Buildings and structures in Hartford, Connecticut
Neag
Neag
Education in Stamford, Connecticut
Educational institutions established in 1940
Embedded educational institutions
Waterbury, Connecticut
Neag
Neag